Maggie Ng (born 28 March 1996) is a Hong Kong female tennis player.

Ng has a career high WTA singles ranking of 640, achieved on 10 June 2019. She also has a career high WTA doubles ranking of 658 achieved on 17 June 2019.

Playing for Hong Kong in Fed Cup, she has a career W/L record of 10–4.

In 2018 Maggie Ng won Prudential Hong Kong National Tennis Championships singles and doubles.

At the 2019 Summer Universiade Held in Naples, Italy, she won the bronze medal in Women's doubles, along with Eudice Chong.

Her only WTA Tour main draw appearance came at the 2015 Hong Kong Tennis Open, where she partnered Ki Yan-tung in the doubles event.

ITF Finals

Singles: 1 (0 titles, 1 runner–ups)

Doubles: 6 (2 titles, 4 runner–ups)

Fed Cup

Singles: 3 (2 win, 1 loss)

Doubles: 7 (4 titles, 3 runner–ups)

References

External links
 
 

1997 births
Living people
Hong Kong female tennis players
Universiade medalists in tennis
Universiade medalists for Hong Kong
Medalists at the 2019 Summer Universiade